Nickey may refer to:

Nickey (name), people with the given name or nickname Nickey
Nickey Chevrolet, American car dealership
Nickey line, former English railway

See also

 Nicki
 Nikky
 Niky

Nickie (disambiguation)
Nicky (disambiguation)
 Nikki (disambiguation)
'Nique (disambiguation)